Hyalella is a genus of amphipods found in the Americas. They are mainly found in freshwater habitats.

Species 
The following species are recognised in the genus Hyalella:

Hyalella anophthalma Ruffo, 1957
Hyalella araucana Grosso & Peralta, 1999
Hyalella armata (Faxon, 1876)
Hyalella azteca (Saussure, 1858)
Hyalella bonariensis Bond-Buckup, Araujo & Santos, 2008
Hyalella brasiliensis Bousfield, 1996
Hyalella caeca Pereira, 1989
Hyalella cajasi Alonso & Jaume, 2017
Hyalella caribbeana Bousfield, 1996
Hyalella carstica Bastos-Pereira & Bueno, 2012
Hyalella castroi Gonzalez, Bond-Buckup & Araujo, 2006
Hyalella catarinensis Reis & Bueno in Reis, Penoni & Bueno, 2020
Hyalella cenotensis Marrón-Becerra, Hermoso-Salazar & Solís-Weiss, 2014
Hyalella cheyennis Bueno, Oliveira & Wellborn, 2019
Hyalella chiloensis Gonzalez & Watling, 2001
Hyalella costera Gonzalez & Watling, 2001
Hyalella crawfordi Coleman & Gonzalez, 2006
Hyalella cuprea (Faxon, 1876)
Hyalella curvispina Shoemaker, 1942
Hyalella dielaii Pereira, 2004
Hyalella dybowskii (Wrześniowski, 1879)
Hyalella echinus (Faxon, 1876)
Hyalella epikarstica Rodrigues, Bueno & Ferreira, 2014
Hyalella falklandensis Bousfield, 1996
Hyalella faxoni Stebbing, 1903
Hyalella formosa Cardoso & Bueno, 2014
Hyalella fossamancinii Cavalieri, 1959
Hyalella franciscae Gonzalez & Watling, 2003
Hyalella gauthieri Coleman & Gonzalez, 2006
Hyalella gracilicornis (Faxon, 1876)
Hyalella imbya Rodrigues & Bueno, 2012
Hyalella jelskii (Wrześniowski, 1879)
Hyalella kaingang Araújo & Cardoso in Bueno, Araujo, Cardoso, Gomes & Bond-Buckup, 2013
Hyalella kochi Gonzalez & Watling, 2001
Hyalella lalage Brehm-Lunz, 1925
Hyalella latimana (Faxon, 1876)
Hyalella longicornis Bousfield, 1996
Hyalella longipalma (Faxon, 1876)
Hyalella longispina Gonzalez & Coleman, 2002
Hyalella longistila (Faxon, 1876)
Hyalella lubomirskii (Wrześniowski, 1879)
Hyalella lucifugax (Faxon, 1876)
Hyalella maya Marrón-Becerra, Hermoso-Salazar & Solís-Weiss, 2018
Hyalella meinerti Stebbing, 1899
Hyalella meraspinosa Baldinger, 2004
Hyalella minensis Bastos-Pereira & Bueno, 2013
Hyalella misionensis Colla & César, 2015
Hyalella montana Rodrigues, Senna, Quadra & Bueno, 2017
Hyalella montenegrinae Bond-Buckup & Araujo, 1998
Hyalella montezuma Cole & Watkins, 1977
Hyalella montforti Chevreux, 1907
Hyalella muerta Baldinger, Shepard & Threloff, 2000
Hyalella neonoma Stock & Platvoet, 1991
Hyalella neveulemairei Chevreux, 1904
Hyalella palmeirensis Streck-Marx & Castiglioni, 2020
Hyalella pamqeana Cavalieri, 1968
Hyalella paramoensis Andres, 1988
Hyalella patagonica (Cunningham, 1871)
Hyalella pauperocovae Gonzalez & Watling, 2002
Hyalella pernix (Moreira, 1903)
Hyalella pleoacuta Gonzalez, Bond-Buckup & Araujo, 2006
Hyalella pseudoazteca Gonzalez & Watling, 2003
Hyalella pteropus Schellenberg, 1943
Hyalella puna Peralta & Miranda, 2019
Hyalella quindioensis Gonzalez & Watling, 2003
Hyalella rioantensis Penoni & Bueno in Reis, Penoni & Bueno, 2020
Hyalella rionegrina Grosso & Peralta, 1999
Hyalella robusta Chevreux, 1907
Hyalella sandro Baldinger, Shepard & Threloff, 2000
Hyalella sapropelica Brehm, 1939
Hyalella solida Chevreux, 1907
Hyalella spelaea Bueno & Cardoso, 2011
Hyalella spinicauda Soucek & Lazo-Wasem in Soucek & Lazo-Wasem, Taylor & Major, 2015
Hyalella squamosa Mateus & Mateus, 1990
Hyalella tepehuana Marrón-Becerra, Hermoso-Salazar & Rivas, 2020
Hyalella texana Stevenson & Peden, 1973
Hyalella thomseni Brehm, 1928
Hyalella troglofugia Bastos-Pereira, De Oliveira & Ferreira, 2018
Hyalella veredae Cardoso & Bueno, 2014
Hyalella wakulla Drumm & Knight-Gray, 2019
Hyalella warmingi Stebbing, 1899
Hyalella wellborni Soucek & Lazo-Wasem in Soucek & Lazo-Wasem, Taylor & Major, 2015
Hyalella xakriaba Bueno & Araujo, in Bueno, Araujo, Cardoso, Gomes & Bond-Buckup, 2013

References

Gammaridea
Taxa named by Sidney Irving Smith
Malacostraca genera